The Bram Stoker Award for Best Screenplay is an award presented by the Horror Writers Association (HWA) for "superior achievement" in horror writing for best screenplay.

Winners and nominees
This category existed between 1998 and 2004. It was reintroduced in 2011. Nominees are listed below the winner(s) for each year.

Original Run

2011-present

References

External links
 Stoker Award on the HWA web page
 Graphical listing of all Bram Stoker award winners and nominees

Screenplay
Screenwriting awards
1998 establishments in the United States
Awards established in 1998
English-language literary awards